Breaking the Ice may refer to:

 Breaking the Ice (film), 1938 American film by Edward F. Cline
 "Breaking the Ice" (Star Trek: Enterprise), an episode of Star Trek: Enterprise
 "Breaking the Ice" (Frasier), an episode of Frasier
 Breaking the Ice (organization), a peace project founded by Heskel Nathaniel
 Breaking the Ice (role-playing game), a 2005 dating game by Emily Care Boss
 "Stanley and Stella in: Breaking the Ice", a computer-animated short film

See also
 Break the Ice (disambiguation)
Don't Break the Ice, a strategy game by Milton Bradley
 Icebreaker (disambiguation)